Calvin Burnett (July 18, 1921, Cambridge, Massachusetts - October 8, 2007 in Medway, Massachusetts) was an African-American artist, illustrator and art educator.

Calvin Burnett graduated from the Massachusetts School of Art in 1942, and received his MFA from Boston University in 1960. He has taught at a number of institutions in the northeastern United States, including the Massachusetts College of Art and the DeCordova Museum. His work has been exhibited extensively throughout the United States, in galleries and museums including the Smithsonian Institution and the Brooklyn Museum.

References

Boston University College of Fine Arts alumni
Massachusetts College of Art and Design faculty
1921 births
2007 deaths
African-American artists
American artists
20th-century African-American people
21st-century African-American people